Khalid Mahmood (born 13 July 1961) is a British Labour Party politician serving as the Member of Parliament (MP) for Birmingham Perry Barr since 2001. He served on the Labour front bench as a shadow Foreign Office minister under leader Jeremy Corbyn, and a shadow Defence minister under leader Keir Starmer until his resignation in 2021. He is also the longest serving Asian MP in the current Parliament.

Early life and education 
Khalid Mahmood was born on 13 July 1961 in Pakistan-administered Kashmir. He studied at UCE Birmingham.

Mahmood is a former engineer with a trade union background. He was a Birmingham City Councillor from 1990 to 1993.

Political career 
Mahmood was elected as the MP for Birmingham Perry Barr in the 2001 general election, becoming the first Muslim MP in England. He held his seat at the 2005 general election. In November 2005 he was appointed as Parliamentary Private Secretary to Tony McNulty, then a minister in the Home Office. He resigned in September 2006 along with several colleagues after signing a letter calling for Tony Blair to resign as prime minister.

In May 2009, it was reported, as part of a series of leaked UK MPs expense details, that Mahmood claimed for £1,350 to stay in a five-star west London hotel with his girlfriend. He also claimed more than £35,000 in expenses for food over eight years.

He was again elected in the 2010 general election. Mahmood opposed the decision by Birmingham College in 2013 to ban students wearing veils. In January 2015, he was nominated for the Politician of the Year award at the British Muslim Awards.

Mahmood was re-elected at the 2015 general election. He was appointed as Shadow Europe Minister in October 2016. He was re-elected in the 2017 general election.

In 2019, it was reported by the Birmingham Mail that Mahmood was the most expensive Birmingham MP in 2018, claiming £210,183 in expenses.

He initially supported Brexit in the 2016 European Union membership referendum, but switched to Remain just before the vote.

Mahmood was re-elected in the 2019 general election. After the election he announced that he would stand in the 2020 Labour Party deputy leadership election, but pulled out of the contest in January 2020. In March 2020, Mahmood defended the anti-racist campaigner Trevor Phillips from claims of Islamophobia, saying that Labour had "lost its way" after it had suspended Phillips. Mahmood said that the move to discipline Phillips had brought "disrepute" on the party.

After Keir Starmer became leader of the Labour Party, Mahmood was appointed as Shadow Minister for Defence Procurement.

As of March 2021, Mahmood is a member of seven All-Party Parliamentary Groups, namely the groups for Bahrain, Cyber Security, International Relations, Kuwait, Kyrgyzstan, Sovereign Defence Capability, and Terrorism.

Mahmood voted against the controversial Police, Crime, Sentencing and Courts Bill's second reading on 16 March 2021.

On 13 April 2021, Mahmood resigned from the shadow frontbench, saying that his party had been taken over by "a London-based bourgeoisie, with the support of brigades of woke social media warriors". He later spoke to Spiked about his decision.

Mahmood has always maintained that the Trojan Horse scandal involved genuine fears that non-violent extreme Islamist attitudes had infiltrated various Birmingham schools. He contributed an introduction to this effect in the Policy Exchange report into the topic published in December 2022.

Personal life 
In January 2014, Mahmood underwent a kidney transplant at the Queen Elizabeth Hospital in Edgbaston, Birmingham, receiving an organ from a donor later revealed to be the Labour politician Siôn Simon. He had been on dialysis, following kidney failure in 2008. His twin brother had previously died from kidney failure.

Mahmood is a member of Unite the Union.

In August 2018, it was reported that Mahmood became involved in an employment tribunal over alleged religious discrimination brought about by his parliamentary assistant, Elaina Cohen, who is Jewish and with whom he was formerly in a 17-year relationship. It emerged that the costs of the legal battle were covered by a Parliamentary expenses system, which was ultimately funded by the taxpayer. The total cost to the taxpayer was reported to be almost £40,000.

It was reported that, despite being in Tier 4 of the Government's priority list for the UK's COVID-19 vaccination, Mahmood was vaccinated in December 2020 at the Queen Elizabeth Hospital in Birmingham, contrary to calls from National Health Service management that the public would be turned away without an appointment.

In August 2022, Mahmood lost an employment tribunal claim with a former staffer, with the court finding his Parliamentary aide Elaina Cohen was unfairly dismissed and 'isolated' by her boss after raising concerns about alleged criminal actions by a colleague. The panel also ruled she had suffered detriment as a result of making a 'protected disclosure' in that she was 'marginalised and isolated in the period January 2020 until her dismissal.'

References

External links 

1961 births
Living people
British Muslims
Labour Party (UK) MPs for English constituencies
Alumni of Birmingham City University
UK MPs 2001–2005
UK MPs 2005–2010
UK MPs 2010–2015
UK MPs 2015–2017
UK MPs 2017–2019
Councillors in Birmingham, West Midlands
People from Azad Kashmir
British people of Mirpuri descent
Pakistani emigrants to the United Kingdom
Naturalised citizens of the United Kingdom
British politicians of Pakistani descent
Kidney transplant recipients
UK MPs 2019–present